La Joliette (Occitan: La Jolieta) is a neighbourhood of the 2nd arrondissement of Marseille located at the start of the autonomous port of Marseille.

Overview
It contains the Docks de Marseille and Marseille Cathedral.

The area is the centre of the Euroméditerranée project, aimed at creating a business district.

Public Transport:

Métro line 2 : 
Station Joliette (exit République and Place de la Joliette)

Tram ligne 2 : 
Stations Joliette (Boulevard de Dunkerque) and Euroméditerranée Gantès (Boulevard de Dunkerque)

Currently, the tramline is being worked on for an extension until Arenc.

See also
Neighbourhood of 2nd arrondissement of Marseille

2nd arrondissement of Marseille
Joliette